Přemysl Kubala (born 16 December 1973) is a Czech volleyball and beach volleyball player. As of 2012, he plays with Petr Beneš who he teamed up with at the 2012 Summer Olympics.

With beach volleyball he played together with Jan Hadrava. They won the bronze medal at the 2015 European Games in Baku.

References

1973 births
Living people
Czech men's volleyball players
Czech beach volleyball players
Olympic beach volleyball players of the Czech Republic
Beach volleyball players at the 2012 Summer Olympics
European Games medalists in beach volleyball
Beach volleyball players at the 2015 European Games
European Games bronze medalists for the Czech Republic
Men's beach volleyball players